Gedo Sule Utura (born 8 February 1990 in Bore, Ethiopia) is an Ethiopian middle distance and long distance runner. She won the 5000 metres at the 2008 World Junior Championships in Athletics and was third place in the 3000 metres at the World Youth Championships in the previous year.

She began competing at road running events: she ran the second leg for the victorious Ethiopian team at the 2008 International Chiba Ekiden and won the BOclassic in 2009. She was the bronze medallist over 5000 m at the 2009 African Junior Athletics Championships. She took the 10K title at the Great Ethiopian Run in November 2010 in a time of 33:35 minutes and was second at that year's BOclassic behind Vivian Cheruiyot.

She ran at the Trofeo Alasport cross country race in March 2011 and was narrowly beaten by Sylvia Kibet at the line. In the absence of major national rivals, she easily won the 5000 m at the Ethiopian Athletics Championships, although the time was slow. At the 2011 All-Africa Games she secured a 5000/10,000 m double. At the start of the 2012 season she was runner-up at the Trofeo Alasport.

Achievements

Personal bests

References

External links

Meet Sule Utura – Ethiopian Running Blog. Roocha.net. 8 July 2008.

1990 births
Living people
Ethiopian female long-distance runners
Sportspeople from Oromia Region
African Games gold medalists for Ethiopia
African Games medalists in athletics (track and field)
Athletes (track and field) at the 2011 All-Africa Games
20th-century Ethiopian women
21st-century Ethiopian women